Wilma Anna Helena Murto (born 11 June 1998) is a Finnish pole vaulter. Murto claimed also victory at the 2023 European Indoor Championships, making her the first Finnish woman in history to win gold at these championships.

She was the 2016 World Under-20 Championships and 2017 European U20 Championships bronze medallist.

Career
Wilma Murto made her international debut at the 2014 World Junior Championships in Athletics held in Eugene, Oregon at the age of sixteen.

On 31 January 2016, the 17-year-old set a new indoor world junior (under-20s) record in Zweibrücken, Germany, where she jumped .

In the following years, Murto struggled with form and it took her until the 2021 season to improve the record further, when she cleared  at the Finnish Championships. Also in the same season, she finished fifth at the delayed 2020 Tokyo Olympics, her best senior championship result up to that point.

At the 2022 European Athletics Championships final, Murto cleared three Finnish records to take her first senior international championship medal, a gold. This mark equalled also the championship record of Katerina Stefanidi, who took silver this time behind Murto. Also in 2022, she placed sixth at the World Championships in Eugene, Oregon.

On 7 January 2023, she improved her own 6-year-old Finnish indoor record, clearing world-leading  on her first attempt in Kuortane.

Statistics

Personal bests
 Pole vault –  (Munich 2022) 
 Pole vault indoor –  (Istanbul 2023) 
 Pole vault indoor U20 –  (Zweibrücken 2016)

International competitions

National titles
 Finnish Athletics Championships
 Pole Vault: 2018, 2019, 2020, 2021
 Finnish Indoor Athletics Championships
 Pole Vault: 2019, 2020

References

External links
 
 

1998 births
Living people
People from Salo, Finland
Finnish female pole vaulters
Athletes (track and field) at the 2016 Summer Olympics
Olympic athletes of Finland
Finnish Athletics Championships winners
World Athletics Championships athletes for Finland
Athletes (track and field) at the 2020 Summer Olympics
Sportspeople from Southwest Finland
21st-century Finnish women
European Athletics Championships winners